This is a list of major cities and towns around the Baltic Sea. The census for Copenhagen, Helsinki and Stockholm includes the urban area.

Port cities and towns of the Baltic Sea
Baltic Sea